Germany was represented by Stefan Raab, with the song "Wadde hadde dudde da?", at the 2000 Eurovision Song Contest, which took place on 13 May in Stockholm. "Wadde hadde dudde da?" was the winner of the German national final, held on 18 February. Raab had been the composer of Germany's notorious 1998 Eurovision entry "Guildo hat euch lieb!"

Background
Prior to the 2000 contest, Germany had participated in the Eurovision Song Contest 45 times since its first entry in 1956, only missing the 1996 contest, when country's entry "Planet of Blue" by Leon didn't qualify from the qualifying round. To this point, the country's best placing was first, which it achieved in 1982 with the song "Ein bißchen Frieden" performed by Nicole. Germany's least successful result was in terms of placement was in 1995 when Germany placed 23rd (last) with the song "Verliebt in Dich" by Stone and Stone, receiving only 1 point in total, while worst result in terms of points was in both 1964 and 1965, when Germany's entries received 0 points total.

The German national broadcaster, NDR broadcasts the event within Germany and organises the selection process for the nation's entry. Germany has used various methods to select its entry in the past, such as internal selections and televised national finals to choose the performer and song to compete at Eurovision. Since 1996, the broadcaster has opted to select the country's representative through the national final, a procedure which was continued for their 2000 participation.

Before Eurovision

Countdown Grand Prix 2000 
Countdown Grand Prix 2000 is the national final format developed by NDR in order to select Germany's entry for the Eurovision Song Contest 2000. The competition was held at the Stadthalle in Bremen, hosted by Axel Bulthaupt. Eleven songs took part and the winner was chosen by televoting. 1,5 million votes were cast. Only the top three songs were announced on the night, but the full placings subsequently found their way into the public domain, together with some of the scoring details. Runner-up was Corinna May, who had won the German national final the previous year before her song was disqualified for violation of pre-performance rules.

At Eurovision 
On the night of the final Raab performed 15th in the running order, following eventual contest winners Denmark and preceding Switzerland. At the close of voting "Wadde hadde dudde da?" had received 96 points, placing Germany 5th of the 24 entries. The 12 points from the German televote were awarded to Denmark.

"Wadde hadde dudde da?" occasioned much debate as to whether or not Raab had intended it to be a joke entry in the manner of "Guildo hat euch lieb!". The quasi-nonsensical lyrics and extravagant costumes and stage presentation led some to this conclusion, but it was also pointed out that, stripped of its visuals, the song was a fairly contemporary-sounding dance track with no obvious comedic elements, and a wacky presentation did not necessarily imply ironic intent.

Voting

References 

2000
Countries in the Eurovision Song Contest 2000
Eurovision
Eurovision